Novokiyevka is a rural locality (a selo) in Chuvalkipovsky Selsoviet, Chishminsky District, Bashkortostan, Russia. The population was 17 as of 2010. There are 2 streets.

Geography 
Novokiyevka is located 41 km south of Chishmy (the district's administrative centre) by road. Romanovka is the nearest rural locality.

References 

Rural localities in Chishminsky District